Whitney Avalon is an American actress, writer, producer, singer, and rapper best known for creating the Princess Rap Battle series and other musical comedy on YouTube, where her channel has over 600 million views.

Variety listed her in their 2015 Comedy Impact Report, stating her work has "amassed over half a billion views" worldwide in a year. She was also named one of Cosmopolitan's "Internet's Most Fascinating" people in 2015.

Princess Rap Battles 
The Princess Rap Battles series was created by Whitney Avalon and features fictional female characters facing off against each other in the form of a rap battle. Whitney Avalon appears in every episode as a major rap opponent.

She posted the first Princess Rap Battle "Snow White vs. Elsa" in September 2014. Since then, she has posted more rap battles on the channel, including "Galadriel vs. Leia", "Mrs. Claus vs. Mary Poppins", and "Cinderella vs. Belle" starring Sarah Michelle Gellar, who is a fan of the series. Subsequent episodes include "Maleficent vs. Daenerys" starring Yvonne Strahovski, "Katniss vs. Hermione" starring Molly Quinn, "Freya vs. Ravenna" and "Rapunzel & Flynn vs. Anna & Kristoff". Avalon then posted two Wonderland vs. Oz themed battles: "Dorothy vs. Alice" starring Emily Kinney, Ryan McCartan, Jason Rogel, and Joey Richter followed by "The Queen of Hearts vs. The Wicked Witch of the West" with Alyssa Preston, Ben Giroux and (like all the battles) Avalon herself. The most recent episode of the series featured Harley Quinn, Black Canary, and Huntress teaming up.

Avalon has created numerous parody music videos particularly of Disney releases and tv shows such as Rick and Morty and The Good Place

Appearance in other media 
Avalon graduated summa cum laude from Brandeis University in 2003 with a B.A. in Theater Arts. She is a working actress in television, theater, and commercials. In 2013, she played the mom in the controversial Cheerios commercial "Just Checking", featuring an interracial family. She has appeared in television series such as Speechless, Outlaw, The Big Bang Theory, Days of Our Lives, Monday Mornings, Girl Meets World, Love That Girl!, and Jane the Virgin. She played Mary Shelley in Edgar Allan Poe's Murder Mystery Dinner Party and was a series regular in Hyperlinked, a YouTube Premium series distributed by Disney.

References

External links
 
 
 
 

American actresses
American parodists
American satirists
American women rappers
Living people
Year of birth missing (living people)
21st-century American rappers
21st-century American women musicians
Women satirists
Music YouTubers
Comedy YouTubers
Brandeis University alumni
Parody musicians
American contraltos
American mezzo-sopranos
21st-century women rappers